The 2016 Icelandic Men's Football League Cup was the 21st season of the Icelandic Men's League Cup, a pre-season professional football competition in Iceland. The tournament started on 12 February and was conclude on 21 April. KR won the league cup after defeating Víkingur R. in the final 2–0.

Participating teams

League tables

Group 1

Group 2

Group 3

Group 4

Knockout stage

Quarter-finals
The top two teams of each group entered the quarter-finals stage, with ties being played  between 7 and 14 April 2016.

Semi-finals
The semi-final matches were contested on 15 and 18 April 2016.

Final
The final was played on 21 April 2016 at Egilshöll in Reykjavík.

Top goalscorers

References

External links
Soccerway

2016 domestic association football cups
2016 in Icelandic football
Icelandic Men's Football League Cup